Kevin Major (born September 12, 1949) is a Canadian author who lives in St. John's, Newfoundland and Labrador with his wife. He writes for both young people and adults, including fiction, literary non-fiction, poetry, and plays.

Major was born and raised in Stephenville, Newfoundland. He later moved to St. John's where he attended Memorial University of Newfoundland.  Before becoming a writer, he taught school in several parts of the province, including the Eastport Peninsula in Bonavista Bay. His early novels are known for exploring issues such as adolescence and  family. The novels were usually set on the island of Newfoundland. In 1992, he was awarded the Vicky Metcalf Award for his body of work. His more recent books are mostly adult fiction, including the Sebastian Synard murder mystery series.

Bibliography
 1978 – Hold Fast ,  (nominated: Books in Canada First Novel Award; winner: Governor General's Award, Book-of-the-Year CACL, Ruth Schwartz Award; placed on Hans Christian Honour List)
 1980 – Far From Shore  (winner: Canadian Young Adult Book Award)
 1984 – Thirty-Six Exposures 
 1987 – Dear Bruce Springsteen 
 1989 – Blood Red Ochre  (nominated: Book-of-the-Year CACL, Geoffrey Bilson Award)
 1991 – Eating Between the Lines  (nominated: Ruth Schwartz Award; winner: Book-of-the-Year CACL, Ann Conner-Brimer Award)
 1993 – Diana: My Autobiography 
 1995 – No Man's Land   and 2005 – No Man's Land: A Play 
 1997 – Gaffer: A Novel of Newfoundland 
 1997 – The House of Wooden Santas ,  (winner: Mr. Christie Award, Ann Conner-Brimer Award)
 2000 – Eh? to Zed: A Canadian Abecedarium  (nominated: Mr. Christie Award, Ann Conner-Brimer Award, Ruth Schwartz Award)
 2001 – As Near to Heaven by Sea: A History of Newfoundland and Labrador –   (nominated: Pearson Writers' Trust Non-Fiction Award)
 2003 – Ann and Seamus  (nominated: Governor General's Award, Mr. Christie Award, Ruth Schwartz Award and five others; made into a folk opera of the same name)
 2005 – Aunt Olga's Christmas Postcards  (winner: Ann Conner-Brimer Award)
 2007 – Gros Morne Time Lines  (with Tara Bryan & Anne Meredith Barry)
 2010 – "New Under the Sun"  (book one of NewFoundLand trilogy; nominated: Atlantic Book Award)
 2014 - "Printmaking on the Edge: 40 Years at St. Michael's" 
 2016 - "Found Far and Wide"  (book two of NewFoundLand trilogy; winner: IPPY silver medal)
 2018 - "One for the Rock"  (first Sebastian Synard crime fiction series)
 2019 - "Land Beyond the Sea"  (book three of NewFoundLand trilogy; nominated: Atlantic Book Award and INDIE book award)
 2020 - "Two for the Tablelands"  (second Sebastian Synard crime fiction series)
 2021 - "Three for Trinity"  (third Sebastian Synard crime fiction series)
 2022 - "Four for Fogo Island"  (fourth Sebastian Synard crime fiction series)

Selected Literary Awards 

 1978 - Hold Fast - Governor General's Children's Literature Award
 1979 - Hold Fast - Canadian Library Association's Book of the Year Award
 1979 - Hold Fast - Ruth Schwartz Award
1980 - Hold Fast - IBBY Honour List
1980 - Far from Shore - Young Adult Caucus, Canadian Young Adult Book Award
1990 - Blood Red Ochre - Geoffery Bilson Award Finalist
1992 - Eating Between the Lines - Ann Connor Brimer Award
1992 - Eating Between the Lines - Canadian Library Association Book of the Year for Children Award
1997 - The House of the Wooden Santas - Mr. Christie's Book Award
1998 - The House of the Wooden Santas - Ann Connor Brimer Award
2001 - As Near to Heaven by Sea - Hilary Weston Writers' Trust Prize for Nonfiction Finalist
2004 - Ann and Seamus - Geoffery Bilson Award Finalist
2006 - Aunt Olga's Christmas Postcards - Ann Connor Brimer Award
2017 - Found Far and Wide - Independent Publisher Book Awards Silver Medalist - Canada East - Best regional fiction
2019 - One for the Rock -  Independent Publisher Book Awards Silver Medalist - Canada East - Best regional fiction
2020 - Land Beyond the Sea - Next Generation Indie Book Award Finalist, Historical Fiction; Best Atlantic-Published Book Award Finalist; Canada Book Award Winner
2021 - Two for the Tablelands - Shortlisted - Howard Engel Award for Best Crime Novel Set in Canada
2022 - Three for Trinity - Shortlisted - Howard Engel Award for Best Crime Novel Set in Canada

References

External links

 author website
 Kevin Major in The Canadian Encyclopedia
 Blog
 

1949 births
Living people
People from Stephenville, Newfoundland and Labrador
Canadian male novelists
20th-century Canadian novelists
21st-century Canadian novelists
Canadian writers of young adult literature
Memorial University of Newfoundland alumni
20th-century Canadian dramatists and playwrights
21st-century Canadian dramatists and playwrights
Canadian male dramatists and playwrights
20th-century Canadian male writers
21st-century Canadian male writers
Writers from Newfoundland and Labrador